Isinga ( or Исингинское) is a fresh water body in the Yeravninsky District, Buryatia, Russia. 

There are vestiges of ancient human settlements on the banks of the Isinga dating back to 4-5 thousand years ago. Archaeological excavations were carried out in 1972 at the sites of ancient settlements, providing a wealth of data in the Isinga area.

Geography
Isinga lake is part of the Yeravna-Khorga Lake System and is the northernmost sizeable lake of the group. The system includes 6 large lakes and a number of smaller ones.

The lake has a large catchment area, which is largely covered by the forest steppe typical of the Vitim Plateau. Lake Khorga (or Kharga) lies very close to the southwest. The Kholoy, a small, shallow tributary of the Vitim River, flows from the eastern shore of Isinga lake.
When the water levels are high the Yeravna lakes further south are connected with each other and the northern ones by intermittent channels. The outlet of the whole lake system is via the Kholoy.

Fish
Isinga lake is noted for its fisheries. Perch, roach, pike and crucian carp, are among the fish species in the lake.

See also
List of lakes of Russia

References

External links
Рыбалка на озеро большое Еравное 2013 - Fishing in Bolshoy Yeravna (in Russian)
Geography of tourism in the Republic of Buryatia
Isinga
ru:Исинга (озеро)